Angel Kolev (born 22 August 1953) is a Bulgarian football manager and former footballer. He is currently Lokomotiv 1929 Sofia's director of football.

Club career
Kolev started his football career at Lokomotiv Sofia, where he was established and played 10 years, becoming their captain winning a league in 1978 and a Bulgarian Cup in 1982.

The release of the injured Hristo Bonev from AEK Athens in the summer of 1982 brought him to the Greek club, with very good letters of recommendation, since the reputation that accompanied Bulgarian international midfielder was that he was a complete midfielder who would help AEK a lot to escape from the looming decline. Kolev did not live up to expectations, the transfer of the president of the club, Zafiropoulos. As if that wasn't enough, he also "sat" on his contract the following season, occupying the extremely valuable position of a foreigner. He did not actively participate in the Greek Cup in 1983. The inaction at AEK and the will of the footballer himself, led him to the decision to retire as a football player, in 1985 at the age of only 33, since his presence in Shumen, was also disappointing.

International career
Kolev played with Bulgaria making 8 appearances.

Managerial career
Kolev got involved in coaching, with Lokomotiv, Akademik Svishtov, AC Omonia and Enosis Neon Paralimni being the main stations of his career.

Honours

As a layer
Lokomotiv Sofia
Bulgarian A Group: 1977–78
Bulgarian Cup: 1981–82

AEK Athens
Greek Cup: 1982–83

References

External links
 

1953 births
Living people
Bulgarian footballers
Bulgaria international footballers
Bulgarian football managers
AC Omonia managers
FC Lokomotiv 1929 Sofia players
AEK Athens F.C. players
First Professional Football League (Bulgaria) players
Footballers from Sofia
Association football wingers